The Tatung Einstein was an eight-bit home/personal computer produced by Taiwanese corporation Tatung, designed in Bradford, England at Tatung's research laboratories and assembled in Bridgnorth and Telford, England. It was aimed primarily at small businesses.

History 

The Tatung Einstein TC-01 was released in the United Kingdom in the summer of 1984, and 5,000 were exported to Taipei later that year. A Tatung monitor (monochrome or colour) and dot matrix printer were also available as options, plus external disc drives and an 80 column display card. It was also capable of running ZX Spectrum software with the "Speculator" addon.

More expensive than most of its rivals, the Einstein was popular with contemporary programmers as a development machine but was commercially unsuccessful.

A later revised version, called the Tatung Einstein 256 and released in 1985, suffered a similar fate.

Design 

The machine was physically large, with an option for one or two built-in three-inch floppy disk drives manufactured by Hitachi. At the time, most home computers in the UK used ordinary tape recorders for storage.  Another unusual feature of the Einstein was that on start-up the computer entered a simple machine code monitor, called MOS (Machine Operating System).  

A variety of software could then be loaded from disk, including a CP/M-compatible operating system called Xtal DOS (pronounced 'Crystal DOS', created by Crystal Computers in Torquay), and a BASIC interpreter (Xtal BASIC). More than 400 software titles were released for the system, including about 120 games. Versions of popular software like DBase or WordStar were available. 

Thanks to the reliability of the machine, and ample memory, the machine proved useful by many software houses to use for programming, and then porting the code to the machines they were made for, namely the Spectrum 48k, Amstrad CPC, and Commodore 64.  Eventually, it was superseded by the PC and Atari ST as the development systems of choice.

The follow on machine, the Einstein 256, basically was the same as the original, with improved video (Yamaha V9938) and a more slimline black case.

Technical specifications 
Both machines were quite similar.

Tatung Einstein TC-01 
The Tatung Einstein TC-01 specifications are similar the MSX standard.
 CPU: Zilog Z80A @ 4 MHz
 ROM: 8K to 32K 
 RAM: 64 KB system; 16 KB video 
 Video: Texas Instruments TMS9129, 16 colours, 32 sprite planes
 Audio: AY-3-8910  (also reads the keyboard matrix)
 Z84C30 CTC
 Z84C20 PIO
 Intel 8251 SIO
 1770 FDC 3'' floppy disk controllers
 Z80 'Tube' bus/interface
 Analogue joystick ports

Tatung Einstein 256 
The Tatung Einstein 256 was similar to the original with improved video (Yamaha V9938) and more RAM.
 RAM: 64K user; 192K video 
 Video: Yamaha V9938,  512 colours

See also

References

External links 

Tatung Einstein Computer Group
Tatung Einstein Reborn

Z80-based home computers
CP/M
Computer-related introductions in 1984
Computers designed in the United Kingdom